Local elections were held in the Philippines on May 13, 2013, the same day and on the same ballot as national elections.  Elected were governors, mayors and council members of Philippine provinces, Philippine cities and Philippine municipalities. Separate elections for barangay officials were held on October.

Positions to be elected are mayors, vice mayors, and councilors, and if applicable, governors, vice governors and provincial board members. There will be elected 80 provincial governors, 80 provincial vice governors, 766 members of the Sangguniang Panlalawigan (provincial board), 138 city mayors, 138 city vice mayors, 1,532 members of the Sangguniang Panlungsod (city council), 1,496 municipal mayors, 1,496 municipal vice mayors, and 11,972 members of the Sangguniang Bayan (municipal council).

Also included are elections in the Autonomous Region in Muslim Mindanao (ARMM) that were supposed to have been held in 2011 but were postponed and synchronized with the triennial elections. Voters in the ARMM will be electing one regional governor, one regional vice governor and 24 members of the regional assembly.

Elections by position

Regional-level elections 
The voters in the Autonomous Region in Muslim Mindanao (ARMM) elect a regional government, composed of a regional governor and a regional vice governor voted separately and under the first past the post system, and a regional assembly composed of three assemblymen elected from each district under the plurality-at-large voting system.

The election was scheduled for 2011, but was postponed to 2013 to be synchronized with the rest of the country. The winning candidates will take over from the appointees of President Benigno Aquino III, who replaced the officials who had their terms expire on 2011.

Provincial-level elections

Each province is headed by a governor and a vice governor. The governor is the chief executive of the province, while the vice governor acts as the governor once the latter is unable to perform his duties, and has the casting vote in the provincial board in case of a tie on a measure, among other powers. While most governors and vice governors run on one ticket, the positions are elected separately, and the winners may come from different tickets.

Each province has a Sangguniang Panlalawigan or provincial board, the legislative body of the province. A province's number of provincial board members depends on its financial standing (generally, the more populous provinces are richer), with the richest provinces having up to 14 board members. In addition, the provincial board has a seat reserved for the president of the provincial chapter of the League of Councilors which are indirectly elected from the city and municipal levels, and two more seats reserved for the presidents of the provincial chapters of the Association of Barangay (village) Captains (ABC) and of the Sangguniang Kabataan (SK; youth councils). These ex officio members are indirectly elected from the municipal and city levels, which were elected by the people in 2010; an election later in the year may change the membership of those two ex officio members.

Election for the provincial board is via first past the post for single-member districts, and plurality-at-large voting for multi-member districts.

*Winning candidates for Camarines Sur are incomplete.

Details

City-level elections
The executive and legislative branches of cities are modeled after provinces, with a mayor, vice mayor and a city council made up of councilors. The city council has up to 36 regular members elected via plurality-at-large voting. Some cities are divided into councilor districts; if a city is divided into two or more congressional districts, the councilor districts would be coextensive with these. Some cities aren't divided into councilor districts; in cases such as this, the entire membership is elected at-large, with the city as one "district". Aside from these regular members, city councils also have two ex officio members composed of the president of the city chapters of the Association of Barangay (village) Captains (ABC) and of the Sangguniang Kabataan (SK; youth councils). These ex officio members are indirectly elected from the barangay level, which were elected by the people in 2010; an election later in the year may change the membership of those two ex officio members.

In the results tables above, in cases when a candidate ran under two parties, a national party and a local party, the seat is credited to the national party. Therefore, all seats won by local parties here refer to parties that did not include a name of a national party on the ballot.

Largest 10 cities

Other cities

Municipal-level elections
The executive and legislative branches of cities are modeled after cities, with the municipal councils being composed of eight (twelve in Pateros) regular members elected at-large. As with city councils, municipal councils have two ex officio members: one each from the municipal presidents of the Association of Barangay Captains, and of the Sangguniang Kabataan, all indirectly elected from the barangay level.

Barangay-level elections 

Elections for barangay level were held in October 2013. Each barangay has a chairman and seven kagawads (councilors) elected at large.

Elections by locality
 Gubernatorial elections (list)

By locality:
 Batangas
Lipa
 Bohol
 Bukidnon
 Valencia
 Bulacan
 Bocaue
 Cavite
 Dasmariñas
 Imus 
 Cebu
 Laguna
 Biñan
 Cabuyao
 Calamba
 San Pablo
 San Pedro
 Santa Rosa
 Iligan
 Metro Manila
Caloocan
Makati
Manila
Marikina
Navotas
Quezon City
Taguig
Valenzuela
 Quezon
 Sarangani
 Zamboanga City
 Naga

Campaign
For April 14 weekend, Catholic Bishops Conference of the Philippines' Vice President Archbishop Socrates Villegas instructed priests to tell their flock during mass "not to vote for the candidate if the candidate cannot declare a categorical and clear 'no' to divorce, abortion, euthanasia, total birth control and homosexual marriages or death issues." This was seen as a setback for President Benigno Aquino's allies who had passed a birth control law the previous year.

See also
Commission on Elections

References

External links
 Official website of the Commission on Elections